Yency Almonte (born June 4, 1994) is an American professional baseball pitcher for the Los Angeles Dodgers of Major League Baseball (MLB). He formerly played in MLB for the Colorado Rockies.

Career

Los Angeles Angels
Almonte attended Christopher Columbus High School in Miami, Florida and was drafted by the Los Angeles Angels of Anaheim in the 17th round of the 2012 Major League Baseball draft. He signed and made his professional debut that year with the Arizona League Angels where he pitched three innings. He pitched 2013 with the Orem Owlz where he was 3–3 with a 6.92 ERA in 13 games (11 starts) and 2014 with the Burlington Bees where he compiled a 2–5 record and 4.93 ERA in nine starts.

Chicago White Sox
Prior to the 2015 season, Almonte was acquired by the Chicago White Sox as the player to be named later from an earlier trade for Gordon Beckham. He pitched that season with the Kannapolis Intimidators and Winston-Salem Dash where he posted a combined 11–7 record and 3.41 ERA in 24 games (22 starts).

Colorado Rockies
On November 24, 2015, Almonte was traded to the Colorado Rockies for Tommy Kahnle. He spent the 2016 season with the Modesto Nuts and Hartford Yard Goats, compiling a combined 11–10 record and 3.58 ERA in 27 starts. The Rockies added him to their 40-man roster after the season. He spent 2017 with Hartford and the Albuquerque Isotopes where he was 8–4 with a 2.91 ERA in 22 games (21 starts). He began 2018 with the Isotopes.

On June 21, 2018, the Rockies promoted Almonte to the major leagues. He made his major league debut that same night, pitching one scoreless inning of relief against the New York Mets at Coors Field. Almonte finished the 2018 season with a 1.84 ERA in 14.2 innings of work. In 2019, Almonte pitched to a 5.86 ERA with 29 strikeouts in 34.0 innings of work. Almonte kept the Rockies from having the worst bullpen in the league in 2020 after recording a 2.93 ERA in 24 appearances, 18 of which were scoreless. In 48 appearances for the Rockies in 2021, Almonte registered a 7.55 ERA with 47 strikeouts in 47.2 innings pitched. On October 21, 2021, Almonte was outrighted off of the 40-man roster and elected free agency on November 7.

Los Angeles Dodgers
On March 13, 2022, Almonte signed a minor league contract with the Los Angeles Dodgers. He was added to the major league roster on May 12. In 33 games, he allowed only four runs in  innings.

On January 13, 2023, Almonte agreed to a one-year, $1.5 million contract with the Dodgers, avoiding salary arbitration.

References

External links

1994 births
Living people
Baseball players from Miami
Major League Baseball pitchers
Colorado Rockies players
Los Angeles Dodgers players
Arizona League Angels players
Orem Owlz players
Burlington Bees players
Kannapolis Intimidators players
Winston-Salem Dash players
Modesto Nuts players
Hartford Yard Goats players
Albuquerque Isotopes players
Salt River Rafters players
Oklahoma City Dodgers players